"Last Last" is a song by Nigerian singer Burna Boy. It was released through Atlantic Records on 13 May 2022 as the first single from his sixth studio album, Love, Damini. The song samples American singer Toni Braxton's 2000 single, "He Wasn't Man Enough", for which its writers LaShawn Daniels, Harvey Mason Jr., and brothers Fred Jerkins III and Darkchild are credited on "Last Last". Burna Boy co-wrote the song with producers Off & Out (brothers Mikael and Samuel Haataja), Chopstix, MdS, and Ruuben. Burna Boy notably performed the song at the 2022 Billboard Music Awards two days after its release.

The official music video for "Last Last", directed by Burna Boy himself, was released alongside the song on 13 May 2022.

Charts

Weekly charts

Year-end charts

Certifications

References

2022 songs
Atlantic Records singles
Burna Boy songs
Songs written by Burna Boy
Songs written by LaShawn Daniels
Songs written by Harvey Mason Jr.
Songs written by Fred Jerkins III
Songs written by Rodney Jerkins